Astra IVA is a family of metro train used by Bucharest Metro, of which 504 cars (252 two-car sets) were built between 1976 and 1993 by Întreprinderea de Vagoane Arad (IVA) in Arad, Romania.

History 

The prototype was made in 1976, with series production starting in 1978. There were three batches, the first being made in 1978-1980 and being distinctive from the others due to a "pit" in the front end, the second one being made between 1980-1985, and the third one made from 1985-1992, featuring red-silver instead of yellow paint from delivery. 

The trains used on the system are made up of various trainsets (Ramă Electrică de Metrou) connected together (Tren Electric de Metrou). Each trainset is made up of two permanently connected train-cars (B′B′+B′B′ formation) that can only be run together. Normally, 3 two-car sets are coupled together to make a complete six-car formation.

Between 1994 and 1996, 42 cars (21 two-car sets) were refurbished by FAUR and Electroputere for service on Line M3, however for unknown reasons the refurbishment project was abandoned and these trainsets are currently preserved at Berceni Depot. These trains were distinguished by a blue livery, and featured new technical equipment. An attempt to build more intermediate coaches to allow for a 3-car x 2 formation was abandoned in 1995. In 2000–2003, all remaining Astra IVA coaches were refurbished and equipped with new ATO and ATP signalling systems, allowing for partial driverless operation especially on Line M4. The Astra IVA trains also underwent further refurbishment by Alstom in 2008, and again in 2011–2014.

The Astra Arad rolling stock is approaching the end of its service life, so the cars are being gradually phased out in favour of newer Bombardier Movia and CAF trains. As of January 2017, 15 trainsets (90 modular cars) are in commercial service.

In 2020, due to the deployment of several Bombardier BM2 sets on the M5 metro line, several IVA sets were sent back on the M3 line to fill in shortages of rolling stock, their redeployment commencing on 24 May.

See also 
 Bucharest Metro

References

External links 

 Page on the ASTRA IVA cars 
 ASTRA/IVA 
 ASTRA/IVA modernized by Alstom 

IVA
Bucharest Metro passenger equipment
Train-related introductions in 1976
Electric multiple units of Romania
750 V DC multiple units